"Round Here" is a song by British singer George Michael from his fifth studio album, Patience. It was released on 1 November 2004 and reached number thirty-two on the UK Singles Chart. The song is about George Michael's childhood and how he remembers his first day at school. The music video (directed by Andy Morahan) includes recording the song in studio, plus some clips of Kingsbury, London, where Michael was born.

Formats and track listings
Enhanced CD single
 "Round Here" – 5:54
 "Patience" – 2:53
 "Round Here" (Video) – 4:56

Charts

References

2004 songs
2004 singles
George Michael songs
Music videos directed by Andy Morahan
Song recordings produced by George Michael
Songs written by George Michael
Sony BMG singles